Sconsia is a genus of large sea snails, marine gastropod mollusks in the family Cassidae, the helmet snails and bonnet snails.

Species

Species within the genus Sconsia include:
 Sconsia striata

References

 Nomenclator Zoologicus info

Cassidae